1944 presidential election may refer to:

 1944 Salvadoran presidential election
 1944 Guatemalan presidential election
 July 1944 Guatemalan presidential election
 1944 Icelandic presidential election
 1944 United States presidential election